The Hongkong and Shanghai Banking Corporation Limited, commonly known as HSBC (styled Wayfoong by the bank),  was the parent entity of the multinational HSBC banking group until 1991, and is now its Hong Kong-based Asia-Pacific subsidiary. The largest bank in Hong Kong, HSBC operates branches and offices throughout the Indo-Pacific region and in other countries around the world. It is also one of the three commercial banks licensed by the Hong Kong Monetary Authority to issue banknotes for the Hong Kong dollar.

The Hongkong and Shanghai Bank was established in British Hong Kong in 1865 and was incorporated as The Hongkong and Shanghai Banking Corporation in 1866, and has been based in Hong Kong (although now as a subsidiary) ever since. It was  "The Hongkong and Shanghai Banking Corporation Limited" in 1989. It is the founding member of the HSBC group of banks and companies, and, since 1990, is the namesake and one of the leading subsidiaries of the London-based HSBC Holdings PLC. The company's business ranges from the traditional High Street roles of retail banking, commercial banking, corporate banking to investment banking, private banking and global banking.

History

Foundation 

After the British established Hong Kong as a crown colony in the aftermath of the First Opium War, merchants from other parts of the British Empire, now in Hong Kong, felt the need for a bank to finance the growing trade, through Hong Kong and sometimes also through Shanghai, between China and India, the rest of the British Empire and Europe, of goods, produces and merchandises of all kinds, but especially opium, cultivated in or transited (re-exported) through the Raj, and to that end, they organised amongst themselves and formed The Hongkong and Shanghai Bank in Hong Kong (March 1865), and in Shanghai one month later.

The founder, Thomas Sutherland of the Peninsular and Oriental Steam Navigation Company, wanted a bank operating on "sound Scottish banking principles." Still, the original location of the bank was considered crucial and the founders chose Wardley House in Hong Kong since the construction was based on some of the best feng shui in colonial Hong Kong. The bank initially leased its premises for HK$500 a month in 1864.

After raising a capital stock of HK$5 million, the bank commenced operations on 3 March 1865. It opened a branch in Shanghai during April of that year, and started issuing locally denominated banknotes in both the Crown Colony and Shanghai soon afterwards. The bank was incorporated in Hong Kong as The Hongkong and Shanghai Banking Corporation by the Hongkong and Shanghai Bank Ordinance (Numbers 2 and 5 of 1866), and a branch in Japan was also established in Yokohama in 1866. Shares of the bank were one of 13 securities initially traded on the Shanghai Stock Exchange, and were traded on that exchange until the Japanese closed the exchange in 1941. The bank handled the first public loan in China in 1874, thereafter issuing most public loans.

Business development

Sir Thomas Jackson became chief manager in 1876. During his twenty-six-year tenure, the bank became a leader in Asia. Notable events included being the first bank established in Thailand, in 1888, where it printed the country's first banknotes; acting as banker for the Hong Kong government from the 1880s; and participating in the management of British colonial government accounts in Penang. A period of expansion followed, with new buildings constructed in Bangkok (1921), Manila (1922) and Shanghai (1923), and a new head office building in Hong Kong in 1935. Bank note issuance displaced other forms of the era and of the region, such as silver taels, due to political and economic instability. HSBC gained significant influence as a result.

Second World War and Chinese Civil War

In anticipation of the Japanese invasion of Hong Kong in 1941, the bank's head office moved to London. The chief manager Sir Vandeleur Grayburn, and his successor David C. Edmondston both died while interned by the Japanese during the Japanese occupation of Hong Kong. Arthur Morse was appointed Chief Manager in 1943 and led the bank after the war. The head office moved back to Hong Kong in 1946. During the Japanese occupation the bank's head office building was occupied as the headquarters of the Hong Kong Japanese military government.

Although its assets were restored to HSBC at the end of the Chinese Civil War, the war affected HSBC's recovery. The Chinese Communist Party took over Shanghai in early 1949, towards the end of the civil war. By 1955, while HSBC was permitted to continue to operate the Shanghai branch, all its operations elsewhere in mainland China were closed. The operations of the Shanghai branch were limited to inward remittances and export bills, and so the bank moved out of its grand headquarters building on the Bund and moved into offices in the Lyceum Building on Yuenmingyuen Road (now Yuanmingyuan Road).

International expansion

Michael Turner became Chief Manager in 1953 and set about diversifying the business. His tenure came to an end in 1962 having established The Hong Kong and Shanghai Banking Corporation of California 1955 and having acquired The British Bank of the Middle East and the Mercantile Bank (based in India) in Aug 1959. Turner was succeeded in 1962 by Jake Saunders. In 1964 the Chief Managership was superseded as the top executive role in the bank by an Executive Chairmanship. Saunders took this role until retirement in 1972 and was succeeded as Chief Manager in 1964 by H.J. Shen, the managing director of Maysun Trading Co. and the former head of the Central Trust of China, who became the first ethnic Chinese to be appointed to the position of Chief Manager of the bank. Under Saunders' tenure the bank continued to expand. 1965 saw the bank purchase a controlling interest in Hang Seng Bank of Hong Kong, and 1972 the formation of a merchant banking arm, Wardley Limited.

In 1980, the bank launched a hostile takeover bid for the Royal Bank of Scotland, although the bid was blocked by the British government.

Creation of the HSBC Group

In 1980, the bank, now under the chairmanship of Michael Sandberg, acquired a 51% stake in Marine Midland Bank, of the United States of America, and continued its expansion with the establishment of Hongkong Bank of Canada (now HSBC Bank Canada) in 1981 and HongkongBank of Australia Limited (now HSBC Bank Australia Limited) in 1986. 1987, under the Chairmanship of William Purves, saw the bank's ownership of Marine Midland Bank increased to 100% and the acquisition of a 14.9% share in Midland Bank in the United Kingdom.

The present building in Hong Kong was designed by Sir Norman Foster and was held as one of the most expensive and technologically advanced buildings in the world in 1986, costing HK$5.3 billion.

On 6 October 1989, it was renamed by the Legislative Council, by an amendment to its governing ordinance originally made in 1929, The Hongkong and Shanghai Banking Corporation Limited, and became registered as a regulated bank with the then Banking Commissioner of the Government of Hong Kong.

In 1991, HSBC reorganised as a holding company, HSBC Holdings plc; shares are traded on the London, Hong Kong, Paris, New York and Bermuda stock exchanges. HSBC Holdings acquired the rest of Midland Bank in June 1992.

Hong Kong banking

Under the HSBC brand, the bank maintains a network of around 220 branches throughout Hong Kong, from which it offers a wide range of financial products and services. For some time in the late 1980s and early 1990s, the bank was known by the name HongkongBank in its native city, although it now trades as HSBC. During that period, it also adopted the idiosyncratic practice of calling its ATMs Electronic Teller Card (ETC) machines.

Headquarters

The HSBC Hong Kong headquarters building is located in No 1 Queen's Road Central in the Central district on Hong Kong Island. It was also home to HSBC Holdings plc's headquarters until the latter firm's move to London to meet the requirements of the UK regulatory authorities after the acquisition of the Midland Bank in 1992. It was designed by British architect Norman, Lord Foster, and was the most expensive building in the world based on usable floor area at the time it was built.

Hong Kong dollar bank notes

HSBC is one of the three commercial banks which are authorised to issue banknotes for Hong Kong - the other two being the Bank of China (Hong Kong) and Standard Chartered Bank (Hong Kong). Of the total notes in circulation measured by value, HSBC is the most prolific issuer, its notes representing 67.7% of those in issue. Hong Kong is unusual in that it is one of the few countries or territories where commercial banks are still permitted to issue their own banknotes.

Other Hong Kong operations

Hang Seng Bank

HSBC acquired a 62.14%, controlling interest in the local Hang Seng Bank in 1965 during a crisis of the latter. The Hang Seng Index for stock prices in Hong Kong is named after the Hang Seng Bank.

PayMe 

In 2017, HSBC launched the PayMe brand and mobile app, which features as a social payment app in Hong Kong, available to all non-HSBC users.

HSBC Insurance 

HSBC Insurance provides insurance products and services to international and local brokers, agents and direct customers in Hong Kong, mainland China, Macau, Singapore, India and Malaysia.

Asia Pacific operations

The Hongkong and Shanghai Banking Corporation maintains a network of around 600 offices in 20 countries in Asia Pacific, as well as owning of a number of HSBC banks operating in various countries and holding the group's stakes in further lenders, particularly in China.

Operations of the group in the Asia Pacific are under this subsidiary, and it forms the regional headquarters for Asia Pacific. This means that it is responsible for entities such as HSBC Bank Australia Limited, Hang Seng Bank Limited, HSBC Bank (China) Company Limited, HSBC Bank Malaysia Berhad (since 2009), HSBC Bank (Vietnam), HSBC Bank (Taiwan) and HSBC Insurance (Asia-Pacific) Holdings Limited, and the management of stakes in Bank of Communications (19.9%), Barrowgate Limited (24.64%) and Industrial Bank. But excluding the majority of the HSBC's Private Banking business in Asia Pacific.

Bangladesh

HSBC started operations in 1996. The bank primarily focuses on urban areas and has branches in most areas of the capital city of Dhaka, it also has branches in the city of Chittagong. The bank also has a good number of ATM booths in the cities present, it also has booths in most five star hotels.

HSBC Bangladesh is rated 'AAA' in the Long-term and ST-1 rating in the Short-term, which are the highest level of ratings for any bank or financial institution in Bangladesh.

HSBC Bangladesh offers a comprehensive range of financial services such as commercial banking, consumer banking, payments and cash management, trade services, treasury, and custody and clearing. The bank also offers offshore banking in the Export Processing Zones, this is only limited to investors in the EPZs. A special service called NRB Services is also available for non-resident Bangladeshis, this service allows consumers to maintain accounts in US Dollars, Pound Sterling and Euros. People using this service can freely remit money from Bangladesh to any part of the world and can access their money from any HSBC booth around the world.

HSBC Bangladesh has a help centre which operates on a daily basis. It is one of the very few banks in the country to offer day night banking. It also has begun to support education initiatives for people with disabilities; the bank recently partnered with the Blind Education and Rehabilitation Development Organisation to give scholarships to people with blindness.

Brunei

On 6 April 2016, HSBC Brunei commenced winding down its operation in Brunei as a part of HSBC Group global review. The bank which comprise retail, commercial and global banking services will no longer take on any new accounts, facilities or business from that date. Employees of the bank have been offered fair redundancy packages. On 9 & 10 November 2017, all HSBC Brunei branches and ATMs had ceased its operations. The remaining accounts were all transferred to the local, Baiduri Bank on the same date.

China

HSBC established its Shanghai branch office on 3 March 1865 and has had a continuous presence in the city since then, except during the Japanese Occupation. Until the economic reforms of the late 1970s, its activities were mainly in inward remittances and export bills, however its activities now span a wider range.

On 6 August 2004, HSBC announced that it would pay US$1.75 billion for a 19.9% stake in Shanghai-based Bank of Communications.  At the time of the announcement, Bank of Communications was China's fifth-largest bank and the investment by HSBC was eight times bigger than any previous foreign investment in a Chinese bank. The industry considered this move, giving HSBC a lead in the race to grab pieces of mainland China's banking market. A year earlier, HSBC had joined with Hong Kong's Shanghai Commercial Bank to purchase an 11% stake in Bank of Shanghai (HSBC paid US$62.6 million for an 8% stake) and US$733 million for a 10% stake in Ping An Insurance.

On 1 April 2007, the mainland China offices of The Hongkong and Shanghai Banking Corporation transferred to its subsidiary HSBC Bank (China), and it started operations on 2 April.

In July 2022, HSBC became the first foreign lender to open a Chinese Communist Party (CCP) committee in its Chinese investment banking subsidiary. The subsidiary, HSBC Qianhai Securities, is a 90% HSBC-owned joint venture.

India

In 1959 HSBC acquired The Mercantile Bank of India, London and China, established in October 1853 in Bombay. HSBC is now one of the fastest growing foreign banks in India, both in domestic banking and support operations for worldwide operations (see Group Service Centres).

Indonesia
The Hongkong and Shanghai Banking Corporation opened its first Indonesian office in Jakarta in 1884. Having been able to restart its operations after the Second World War, it was again forced to close in the mid-1960s, however the bank was granted a new banking licence in 1968 its operations have grown to make it one of the largest foreign banks operating in Indonesia.

Japan
HSBC opened its first Japan operations in Yokohama in 1866, followed by branches in other trading ports such as Osaka, Kobe and Nagasaki. It was heavily involved in the early development of Japan's current monetary system, and consulted with the government regarding fiscal policy, currency printing and related matters.

HSBC does not conduct ordinary retail banking in Japan, but conducts investment banking in Tokyo and Osaka. Since 2007 it has expanded its HSBC Premier private banking services for the "Mass affluent" market or high-net-worth individual clients. HSBC Premier has seven Premier branches in Japan including centers in the Hiroo, Akasaka, Marunouchi(flagship), Ginza, Yokohama, Ikebukuro, areas of Tokyo and one in Kobe.

In December 2011, HSBC announced to selling its private bank in Japan to Swiss peer Credit Suisse for an undisclosed sum, but at the end of October 2011 the value of the gross assets included in the sale was about $2.7 billion. It was a strategy to cut $3.5 billion annual costs by quitting businesses or countries where it lacks scale which Credit Suisse has a larger business in Japan than HSBC and in line with a global business restructuring it announced that will see it cut 30,000 jobs as it pares back small or inefficient operations.

New Zealand
HSBC's operations in New Zealand are as a branch of The Hongkong and Shanghai Banking Corporation, which first gained a licence from the Reserve Bank of New Zealand on 22 July 1987. Today HSBC offers a range of financial products from a network of 9 offices.

Philippines
HSBC's history in the Philippines dates back more than 110 years with the establishment of their first branch no. 90 Rosario Street (Now Quintin Paredes Street) in Binondo, Manila in 1875. In its early years of operation, HSBC serviced the booming Philippine sugar industry. At the turn of the century, it financed railways that connected provincial towns across Luzon to Manila. During the American regime, HSBC was called to advise on Philippine currency reform. Its current headquarters are in Fort Bonifacio.  Today, HSBC Philippines operates in key Philippine cities such as Cebu and Davao. It has ended Citibank and Standard Chartered's duopoly on international banking in the Philippines.

Singapore

In Singapore, The Hongkong and Shanghai Banking Corporation Limited operates as a full service bank with its headquarters in Collyer Quay. It opened its doors in December 1877. In 2016, HSBC has created a locally incorporated bank in Singapore and has moved its retail and wealth business from HSBC Singapore Branch to the locally incorporated bank.
Today, HSBC's flagship office remains at the original Collyer Quay site where its first branch was opened. Its main office is located at Mapletree Business City in Pasir Panjang, HarbourFront.

HSBC Singapore is a Qualifying Full Bank and offers a comprehensive range of financial services including commercial banking, investment and private banking, insurance, forfaiting and trustee services, and securities and capital markets services.

The retail and wealth business operated through the locally incorporated bank has 12 branches incorporating 10 HSBC Premier Centres and 33 Automated Teller Machines in Singapore.

In the 1960s, a group of Indonesian forces bombed the HSBC building in Singapore, just a few months after Singapore was granted its independence from Malaysia. A number of people were killed and the two military officers responsible for the bombing were tried and executed.

South Korea
HSBC is expanding in competitive South Korean market, operating from a network of 11 branches, the first having been opened in Jemulpo in 1897 .

Sri Lanka
HSBC has been present in Sri Lanka for 120 years. The Hongkong and Shanghai Banking Corporation Limited established its first branch in Colombo Sri Lanka on 1 July 1892, just 27 years after it began operating in Hong Kong and Shanghai. It has established itself as one of the largest and most profitable banks operating in the country. It has achieved leadership in Corporate Banking, Capital Markets and Credit Card issuance.

Taiwan

HSBC's presence in Taiwan dates back to 1885 when The Hongkong and Shanghai Banking Corporation appointed an agent in Tamsui. A full service branch was established in Taipei in 1984. The bank now has a network of 8 branches (Hyperlink to service channel) nationwide, including Taipei, Jianguo, Banqiao, Tianmu, Taoyuan, Taichung, Tainan, and Kaohsiung. In 2007, The Hongkong and Shanghai Banking Corporation acquired The Chinese Bank in Taiwan. The acquisition made HSBC's nationwide branch network increase to 47.

Thailand

HSBC initially opened for business in Thailand in 1888, becoming the first commercial bank in the country. HSBC has made significant contributions to the establishment of solid foundations for Thailand's financial and banking sectors. For example, in 1889 HSBC issued the first banknotes in Thailand. HSBC also issued the first foreign loan to the Thai government for its railroad construction project. HSBC's main branch office in Thailand is situated in Bangkok on Rama IV Road opposite Lumpini Park. In 2011, Phase 2 of the new Financial Sector Master Plan allowed foreign banks to open up to two branches in the Kingdom of Thailand in preparation for full retail operations. Accordingly, a second branch was opened on Thonglor (Sukhumvit 55) in early 2011.

In January 2012 HSBC announced the sale of its Thailand retail banking operations to the Krungsri Group (Bank of Ayudhya)
and its intention to maintain only corporate banking business in Thailand. Its 2 retail branches will be closed in March and June 2012 respectively.

Vietnam
In Vietnam, HSBC first opened an office in Saigon (now Ho Chi Minh City) in 1870. In August 1995, HSBC opened a full-service branch in Ho Chi Minh City. In 2005, HSBC also opened its second branch in Hanoi and established a representative office in Can Tho.

On 29 December 2005, HSBC acquired 10% share capital of Vietnam Technological and Commercial Joint Stock Bank (Techcombank), one of the largest joint stock commercial banks in Vietnam by equity. In July 2007, HSBC became the first foreign bank to increase its stake in Techcombank to 15%. In September 2008, HSBC completed the increase of its stake in Techcombank to 20%, became the first foreign bank in Vietnam to hold a 20% interest in a domestic bank.

In September 2007, HSBC acquired 10% share capital of Bao Viet Holdings, becoming the sole foreign strategic partner of Vietnam's leading insurance company. In October 2009, HSBC signed an agreement to increase its shareholding in Bao Viet Holdings to 18% from 10% for VND1.88 trillion (approximately US$105.3 million).

On 1 January 2009, HSBC started operating its locally incorporated entity and became the first foreign bank to incorporate in Vietnam, after gaining approval from the State Bank of Vietnam (SBV) to set up a Wholly Foreign-Owned Bank (WFOB) in Vietnam in September 2008.

Leadership 

 Current chairman: Peter Wong (since June 2021); non-executive chairman
 Current chief executive: David Liao and Surendra Rosha (since June 2021); co-chief executives

List of former chairmen 
In 1991, the superseding position of group chairman of HSBC was formed; since then, the chairman of the Hongkong and Shanghai Banking Corporation has been held as an independent position, held concurrently by the chief executive of the Hongkong and Shanghai Banking Corporation, or held by the group chief executive of HSBC ex-officio.

 Francis Chomley (1865–1866)
 John Dent (1867)
 Edward Cunningham (1867)
 Agathon Nissen (1867)
 George Hellend (1867–1868)
 George Heard (1869)
 Henry Lemann (1870)
 Richard Rowett (1871–1872)
 Thomas Pyke (1872–1873)
 Solomon Sassoon (1873–1874)
 William Forbes (1874–1875)
 Adolph von Andre (1875–1876)
 Emanuel Belilios (1876–1877)
 Hans Hoppius (1877–1878) 
 Frederick Sassoon (1878–1879)
 William Forbes (1879–1880); second term
 William Keswick (1880–1881)
 Alexander McIver (1881–1882)
 Henry Liston-Dalrymple (1882–1883)
 Wilhelm Reiners (1883)
 Alexander MacEwen (1883–1885)
 Frederick Sassoon (1885–1886); second term
 Alexander McIver (1886); second term
 Max Grote (1886–1887)
 Charles Bottomley (1887–1888)
 John Bell-Irving (1888–1889)
 William Forbes (1889–1890); third term
 Henry Liston-Dalrymple (1890–1891); second term
 Jacob Moses (1891–1892)
Stephen Michaelsen (1892–1893)
Hans Hoppius (1893–1894); second term
Charles Holliday (1894–1895)
Jacob Moses (1895–1896); second term
Alexander McConachie (1896–1897)
Stephen Michaelsen (1897–1898)
James Jardine Bell-Irving (1898–1899)
Roderick Gray (1899–1900)
Nicolaus Siebs (1900–1901)
James Keswick (1901–1902)
Robert Shewan (1902–1903)
Abraham Raymond (1903–1905); two consecutive terms
Herbert Tomkins (1905–1906)
Armin Haupt (1906–1907)
George Medhurst (1907–1908)
Henry Keswick (1908–1909)
William Gresson (1909–1910)
Herbert Tomkins (1910–1911); second term
Edward Shellim (1911–1912)
Francis Armstrong (1913–1914)
David Landale (1914–1916)
Walter Pattenden (1916–1917)
Stanley Dodwell (1917–1918)
Percy Holyoak (1918–1919)
John Plummer (1919–1920)
Edward Parr (1920–1921)
George Edkins (1921–1922)
George Dodwell (1922–1923)
Archibald Lang (1923–1924)
Dallas Bernard (1926–1928)
Albert Compton (1928–1929)
Neilage Brown (1929–1930)
John Plummer (1930–1931); second term
Charles Mackie (1931–1932)
John Paterson (1932–1933)
Thomas Pearce (1933–1934)
Charles Mackie (1934–1935); second term
Stanley Dodwell (1935–1936)
John Paterson (1936–1937); second term
Geoffrey Miskin (1937–1938)
Thomas Pearce (1938–1939); second term
Andrew Shields (1939–1940)
Harrie Wilkinson (1940–1941)
John Paterson (1941–1942); third term
Arthur Morse (1941–1953)
Cedric Blaker (1954–1958)
Michael Turner (1959–1962)
Hugh Barton (1962–1963)
William Knowles (1964)
John Saunders (1964–1972)
Guy Sayer (1972–1977)
Michael Sandberg, Baron Sandberg (1978–1986)
Sir William Purves (1986–1994); Group Chief Executive from 1990 to 1992; group chairman from 1990 to 1998; 
John Gray (1994–1996); concurrent chief executive
John Strickland (1997–1999)
David Eldon (1999–2005)
Vincent Cheng (2005–2010); first local Hong Kong Chinese chairman
Michael Geoghegan (2010–2011); group chief executive from 2006 to 2011
Stuart Gulliver (2011–2017); concurrent group chief executive
John Flint (2017–2019); concurrent group chief executive
Laura Cha (2019–2021); non-executive chairman

List of former chief executives 
Known as chief managers prior to 1986; in 1991, the superceding position of group chief executive of HSBC was formed, with the Chief Executive of the Hongkong Shanghai Banking Corporation now being the Asia-Pacific regional head.

 Victor Kresser (1868–1870)
 James Greig (1871–1876)
 Sir Thomas Jackson (1876–1886)
 John Walter (1886–1887)
Sir Thomas Jackson (1887–1889); second term
 George Noble (1889–1890)
Sir Thomas Jackson (1890–1891); third term
 François de Bovis (1891–1893)
Sir Thomas Jackson (1893–1902); fourth term
 James Smith (1902–1910)
 Newton Stabb (1910–1920)
 Alexander Stephen (1920–1924)
 Arthur Barlow (1924–1927)
 Arthur Hynes (1927–1930)
 Sir Vandeleur Grayburn (1930–1941)
 Sir Arthur Morse (1941–1953)
 Michael Turner (1953–1962)
 Sir Jake Saunders (1962–1964)
 Hsi-Jui Shen (1964–1972)
 Guy Sayer (1972–1977)
 Michael Sandberg, Baron Sandberg (1978–1986)
 Sir William Purves (1986–1992)
 John Gray (1993–1996)
 David Eldon (1997–1999)
 Aman Mehta (1999–2004)
 Michael Smith (2004–2007)
 Sandy Flockhart (2007–2009)
 Peter Wong (2010–2021)

Cultural references

In Hong Kong, the local population sometimes refers to the bank as 獅子銀行, "the Lion Bank", after the pair of lion sculptures outside the bank's headquarters, which also appear in some banknotes. Local films and television series set in Hong Kong, especially comedies, use this nickname when referring to the bank.

Although the Hong Kong Government changed the official spelling of "Hongkong" to "Hong Kong", by the instructions of the Secretary of State for the Colonies, on 3 September 1926, HSBC uses the older Hongkong, as the bank's name was conceived before the official declaration of the modern two-word name, and it was decided to retain the single word spelling in the bank's name: Hongkong.

The English humorist P. G. Wodehouse was a junior employee at the bank's London office in Lombard Street from 1900 to 1902, and used the bank as an inspiration for some of his early work, especially his 1910 novel Psmith in the City.

See also

HSBC Holdings plc
HSBC Bank (China)
HSBC Bank Australia
HSBC Bank Malaysia
Hang Seng Bank
Bank of Communications
HSBC Hong Kong headquarters building

References

Further reading
 King, A. H. ed. Eastern banking: essays in the history of the Hongkong and Shanghai Banking Corporation (1983) online

External links
The Hongkong and Shanghai Banking Corporation Limited
HSBC History
John Gray - Daily Telegraph obituary

Banks established in 1865
1865 establishments in Hong Kong
Banks of Hong Kong
HSBC subsidiaries
Companies formerly listed on the Hong Kong Stock Exchange
Companies formerly listed on the Shanghai Stock Exchange
Former companies in the Hang Seng Index
Banknote issuers of Hong Kong
History of companies of China
Chinese companies established in 1865